WTWZ (1120 AM) is a radio station licensed to serve Clinton, Mississippi.  The station is owned by Wood Broadcasting.  Its format is Oldies, with religious programming every morning.

The station has been assigned these call letters by the Federal Communications Commission since April 19, 1982.

WTWZ had originally broadcast on 1150 kHz with 500 watts.

To give the station nighttime coverage, WTWZ can also be heard via translator station W273CY 102.5 FM.

WTWZ even airs vintage radio shows overnight.

In May, 2022, WTWZ made the switch to oldies.  However, it still has religious programming every morning.

References

External links

TWZ
TWZ